

Tournament 

Kisei (Go)
1994 in go